The Lahuli–Spiti  languages are a subgroup of the Tibetic languages spoken in the Lahaul and Spiti region of Himachal Pradesh, India, belonging to the South-Western group of Tibetic languages, earlier classified as  Western Innovative Tibetan. They are more closely related to Standard Tibetan than to the neighboring Ladakhi–Balti languages spoken further north.

According to Tournadre (2014), the Lahuli–Spiti languages include:
Lahuli (Stod Bhoti)
Spiti
Nyamkat
Bhoti Kinnauri
Tukpa (Nesang)

References

Languages of India
Bodish languages
Endangered languages of India